Raza Jawad Hussain (20 April 1939 – 26 April 2008), commonly known as Joe Hussain, was an Indian cricketer. He played only one first-class match, for Tamil Nadu against Andhra in the 1964–65 Ranji Trophy. He scored 17 in his only innings, bowled one over for three runs, and did not hold a catch.

Education 
He is the Alumnus of Loyola college. Chennai. 

Hussain owned a cricket school in Ilford which was started by coach Harold Faragher, where players such as Graham Gooch and former England cricketer John Lever once trained. He died on 26 April 2008 at the age of 69 due to heart and lung failure caused by pneumonia.

Personal life 
He married a English woman and was the father of former England Test captain Nasser Hussain, former Worcestershire player Mel Hussain and the ballerina Benazir Hussain.

References

External links
 

Hussain, Jawad
Hussain, Jawad
Hussain, Jawad
1939 births
Indian emigrants to the United Kingdom
Indian cricket coaches
Hussain family